Martin Bisi (born 1961) is an American producer and songwriter. 
He is known for recording important records by Sonic Youth, Swans, John Zorn, Material, Bill Laswell, Helmet, Unsane, The Dresden Dolls, Cop Shoot Cop, White Zombie, Boredoms, Angels of Light, J.G. Thirlwell, and Herbie Hancock's Grammy-winning song "Rockit".

Early life
Martin Bisi was born in 1961 to Argentinian parents and grew up in Manhattan. His mother was a concert pianist who specialized in Liszt and Chopin and toured extensively, and his father played tango-style piano as a hobby. As a child in the 1960s his parents sent him to a French school, gave him music lessons, and took him to performances by the New York Philharmonic and the opera, all of which he rebelled against.

Career
In 1981, he started B.C. Studio (initially named OAO, Operation All Out, Studio) with Bill Laswell and Brian Eno in the Gowanus section of Brooklyn, where he recorded much of the No Wave, avant garde, and hip-hop of the early 1980s including Lydia Lunch, Live Skull, Fred Frith and Afrika Bambaataa. In 1982, he recorded the instruments for the first song Whitney Houston recorded as a lead singer, "Memories" off of Material's One Down LP. Soon after recording Herbie Hancock's "Rockit", Bisi split from Bill Laswell but continued working from BC Studio till present time, with a specialty in loud, dense sound, such as Foetus, Season to Risk, and Serena Maneesh.

In 2021, he worked with the Hypnagogia album of Travis Duo.

Solo career 
Bisi also recorded his own material

 Creole Mass (LP -1988  New Alliance/SST) with Lee Ranaldo and Fred Frith 
 All Will Be Won (LP -1992 New Alliance/SST) 
 See Ya in Tiajuana (EP -1994 New Alliance/SST) 
 Dear Papi I'm in Jail (EP -1996 New Alliance/SST)
 Milkyway of Love (LP -1999 Stripmine) 
 Sirens of the Apocalypse (LP -2008 Labelship, Black Freighter) 
 Son of a Gun (EP -2010 Contraphonic, Black Freighter) with Bill Laswell, Brian Viglione of The Dresden Dolls and Bob D'Amico of Sebadoh 
 Ex Nihilo (LP -2014 Labelship, Black Freighter) 
 Solstice (LP -2019 Bronson Recordings) 

In 2009, Bisi made his first extensive touring in the US and Europe. 

In 2014 he toured in support of a feature-length documentary about BC Studio, Sound & Chaos: "The Story Of BC Studio", directed by Sara Leavitt and Ryan Douglass.

In January 2016, Bisi celebrated the 35 year anniversary of his BC Studio with a weekend of performances by close to 50 musicians who'd worked there over the decades. These were recorded and then worked into an album called BC35, released on April 20, 2018 on Bronson Recordings. Bisi continues to tour in support of BC35 with his band, called Martin Bisi band, which involves a revolving cast of musicians.

References

External links

Martin Bisi's official website
BC35 official website
Official website of Sound & Chaos: The Story Of BC Studio documentary
Martin Bisi on YouTube
Martin Bisi on Facebook
Martin Bisi on Twitter

Record producers from New York (state)
Songwriters from New York (state)
Living people
Musicians from Brooklyn
American people of Argentine descent
1961 births
Place of birth missing (living people)